Smithdon High School (formerly known as Hunstanton Secondary Modern School and Hunstanton School) is a small comprehensive school (ages 11–16) academy, with 627 students in Hunstanton, Norfolk. Its buildings are Grade II* listed.  It changed its status, joining the West Norfolk Academies Trust in 2016. Ofsted rated the school as 'requires improvement' in 2019.

The Grade II* listed buildings were designed by Peter and Alison Smithson. They were completed in 1954, in the modernist style that became known as New Brutalism. They have remained largely unchanged though some of the featured clear glass panels were replaced by black panels to overcome a solar overheating problem. They were listed in 1993.

School history
The school was opened in 1954. It was a product of extreme austerity, intended to educate the boys and girls aged 11 to 15 who had failed the 11-plus. The school became non-selective following the 1965 Circular 10/65 and in 1972 the school leaving age was raised to 16. The school had a wide catchment area, which includes many small, rural villages receiving students at 11 (year 7) from primary schools and 13 (year 9) from middle schools in the Norfolk three-tier system. This reverted to two tier. After a Good Ofsted Report in 2014, the school changed its status to an academy, within the West Norfolk Academies Trust Group. In 2019, Smithdon High School again received a 'needs improvement' report from Ofsted.

Description
This is a small school, that no longer has a sixth form. It has difficulty in recruiting and retaining staff. Pupils feel it is a safe, friendly school though attendance is a problem. The head is seen as strict but fair. The curriculum is well laid out in curriculum plans.

Curriculum
Virtually all maintained schools and academies follow the National Curriculum, and are inspected by Ofsted on how well they succeed in delivering a 'broad and balanced curriculum'. The school has to decide whether Key Stage 3 contains or whether year 9 should be in Key Stage 4 and the students just study subjects that will be examined by the GCSE exams at 16. Smithdon had decided to take the latter approach they are reconsidering this decision after reading the Ofsted report.
Ofsted pointed out that the 
In some subjects, pupils have not been given enough time to cover the full curriculum in key stage 3. ... In some subjects, plans are not as well sequenced. This means that pupils do not get a strong enough grasp of important knowledge and concepts. In these subjects, pupils are not as well prepared for their key stage 4 studies. We saw examples of this in art, history and languages. 

In 2019,  Key Stage 3 and 4 students studied:

Potential Key Stage 5 students are offered places in the sixth form at Springwood High School in Lynn.

Buildings

Architectural history

Hunstanton School, built between 1949 and 1954, is an important work by Alison and Peter Smithson. It was known locally as 'the glasshouse'. The school was strikingly modern in many ways, most notably in its extensive use of glass and steel, and the unusual free-standing water tower.

The Smithsons struggled with reuniting modernist architectural style of the Festival of Britain with the community. 
Hunstanton School, with its exposed structure and services, with its references to Mies van der Rohe was an answer. It was described by architectural critics as New Brutalism. This was the first time this description had been used, and was then adopted to describe all buildings of this genre, and profoundly influenced school design and public buildings.

The school's main building was designated a Grade II* listed building in 1993. The school gymnasium was listed at Grade II* the same year.

Description
This is a two-storey, flat roofed, roughly symmetrical rectangular block with two internal courtyards and a central double-height hall spanning two main ranges. The classrooms are all on the first floor reached by individual stair columns- or columns that service at most three classrooms. This was done to prevent the perceived noise and disruption caused by long corridors. The classrooms were fully glazed, with obscured panels below cill height. It was built using a galvanised steel frame with buff sandlime brick infill. The steel framed windows were fitted without subframes. There were single storeyed workshops and kitchens to north. A feature is the steel framed water tower with steel tanks, built between the blocks.

The extensive use of glazing was a feature, but has become an environmental problem, as it produced a cold building in winter, and effectively a greenhouse in summer.

References

External links

Hunstanton
Grade II* listed buildings in Norfolk
Secondary schools in Norfolk
Educational institutions established in 1954
Brutalist architecture in England
1954 establishments in England
Academies in Norfolk